Now That's What I Call Music! 2 or Now 2 may refer to four "Now That's What I Call Music!" series albums.
 Now That's What I Call Music II (UK series), released on 26 March 1984
 Now That's What I Call Music! 2 (Asia), released on 9 August 1996 
 Now! 2 (Canadian series), released in 1997
 Now That's What I Call Music! 2 (U.S. series), released on 27 July 1999

See also
Now That's What I Call Music! discography